Vitaliy Viktorovych Rozghon (born 23 March 1980 in Khmelnytskyi) is a Ukrainian retired footballer and manager. In July 2012, he played for FC Tytan Armyansk.

References

1983 births
Living people
Sportspeople from Khmelnytskyi, Ukraine
Ukrainian footballers
Ukrainian expatriate footballers
Expatriate footballers in Russia
PFC Krylia Sovetov Samara players
FC Arsenal Kyiv players
FC Podillya Khmelnytskyi players
SC Tavriya Simferopol players
FC Lviv players
PFC Sumy players
FC Naftovyk-Ukrnafta Okhtyrka players
FC Tytan Armyansk players
Ukrainian Premier League players
Ukrainian First League players
Ukrainian Second League players
Russian Premier League players
Ukrainian football managers
FC Arsenal Bila Tserkva managers
Association football defenders
FC Mashuk-KMV Pyatigorsk players